This is a list of programs and specials formerly and currently broadcast by the children's cable television channel Disney XD in the United States, and previously throughout the world on its international sister networks. Dates listed below are for American premiere or finales.

Current programming

Original programming

Live-action series

Acquired programming

Animated series

Repeats of ended series
A list of programs currently broadcast in reruns.

Animated series

Programming from Disney Channel

Programming from Disney Junior

Programming from Disney+

Former programming

Original programming

Animated series
1 Indicates program moved from Jetix.
2 Indicates program moved to the Disney Channel cable channel.

Live-action series

Miniseries

Short series

D|XP programming

Acquired programming

Animated

Live-action

Syndicated

Animated

Live-action

Movies

Programming from Disney Channel

Animated series

Live-action series

Programming from Disney Junior

Original films

Programming blocks

Former
 Disney XD's Saturday Morning (2009–13) 
 Disney XD's My Life (2010)
 Saturday Mornings Disney XD Style (2010)
 Phineas and Ferb's Summer Vacation (2010)
 Marvel Universe (2012–19)
 Nonstop Summer (2012–13)
 Disney Fandom (2013)
 Randomation Animation (2013–14)
 Show Me the Monday (2013–14)
 Show Me the Shark (2014)
 Animacation (2014)
 Anime Block (2017–20)
 D|XP (2017)

See also
ABC Kids
 List of programs broadcast by Disney Channel
 List of programs broadcast by Fox Kids, whose library was merged into the Toon Disney schedule in 2002
 List of programs broadcast by Jetix, Toon Disney's evening block from 2004 until 2009
 List of programs broadcast by Toon Disney, its branding from 1998 until 2009

Notes

References 

 
Disney XD
Disney Channel related-lists